Saša Mišić (born 24 August 1987) is a Serbian football goalkeeper who played for Borac Čačak.

Career
Born in Valjevo, Mišić passed FK Partizan youth school. Next he joined Zemun, where he played between 2005 and 2007 but was loaned to lower ranked league clubs Kolubara and Posavac in the meantime. Later he was with Radnički Pirot, Radnički Kragujevac, and Čukarički. He also spent season and a half under contract with Metalac Gornji Milanovac and was loaned to OFK Mladenovac during the time. After solid 2013 year spent with Jedinstvo Putevi, Mišić joined Javor Ivanjica at the beginning of 2014, but he left the club after 6 months and spent the rest of a year with Mladost Velika Obarska. He was also with Sloboda Užice and Bežanija before he joined Borac Čačak in 2016.

References

External links
 
 Saša Mišić stats at utakmica.rs 
 
 

1987 births
Living people
Sportspeople from Valjevo
Association football goalkeepers
Serbian footballers
FK Zemun players
FK Kolubara players
FK Radnički Pirot players
FK Radnički 1923 players
FK Čukarički players
FK Berane players
FK Metalac Gornji Milanovac players
OFK Mladenovac players
FK Jedinstvo Užice players
FK Javor Ivanjica players
FK Sloboda Užice players
FK Bežanija players
FK Borac Čačak players
FK Mladost Velika Obarska players
Serbian First League players
Serbian SuperLiga players